Mihalj Kečkeš (24 September 1913 – 31 December 1985) was a Yugoslav footballer.

Born in Subotica in 1913, then still within Austro-Hungary, he was a midfielder and he begin his career playing in FK Bačka 1901. He also played with the other two pre-World War II Yugoslav First League clubs from Subotica, SAND and ŽAK before signing with Jedinstvo Belgrade. In January 1937 there was a conflict between ŽAK and Jedinstvo because both clubs had registered the player at the Football Association of Yugoslavia which decided that his registration for Jedinstvo was the valid one.  After moving to Jedinstvo he became Yugoslav national team player, having played two matches for the national team, one in 1937 and another one in 1938.  After retiring he became a coach in his hometown city of Subotica, where he died in 1985.  He was among the founders of FK Partizan Subotica in 1948 and a coach and a player in the club. He was also coach at FK Radnički Bajmok and FK Solid.  He is sometimes referred to as Mihajlo Kečkeš.

References

1913 births
1985 deaths
Sportspeople from Subotica
Yugoslav footballers
Yugoslavia international footballers
Association football midfielders
FK Bačka 1901 players
SAND Subotica players
ŽAK Subotica players
SK Jedinstvo Beograd players
Yugoslav First League players
Yugoslav football managers